Baler, officially the Municipality of Baler, is a 3rd class municipality and capital of the province of Aurora, Philippines. According to the 2020 census, it has a population of 43,785 people.

It is host to spectacular geographic formations and is situated on a vast plain at the south end of Baler Bay, a contiguous segment of the Philippine Sea.

It became the capital of Aurora on 14 June 1951 under Republic Act No. 648 signed by President Elpidio Quirino. It remained the seat of government of Aurora on 21 November 1978 under Batas Pambansa Blg. 7 signed by President Ferdinand Marcos.

Etymology

History

Spanish colonial period

 

In 1609, seven Franciscan missionaries, led by Fray Blas Palomino, founded the settlement of Baler, which was later converted into a pueblo (town) by the Augustinians and the Recollects in 1658. Due to scarcity of religious missionaries, the Franciscans again took over the administration of the settlement in 1703.

On 27 December 1735, a great storm came and a huge wave called tromba marina devastated the old town settlement, then located in Barrio Sabang. Among the survivors were the Angaras, Bijasas, Bitongs, Lumasacs, Carrascos, and Pobletes who swam toward the nearby Ermita Hill. A new community sprang into what is now the Poblacion of Baler, leaving "Kinagunasan," the place of devastation. A mural depicting this wave can be found in the Museo de Baler in town.

On 27 June 1898, 15 days after the Philippine Declaration of Independence, 54 Spanish soldiers of the Baler garrison, under the command of Captain Enrique de las Morenas y Fossi, made San Luis Obispo de Tolosa Church, named in Spanish for Louis of Toulouse, their barracks. When de las Morenas died on 22 November 1898, Lieutenant Saturnino Martín Cerezo replaced him. On 2 June 1899, the last Spanish garrison in the Philippines surrendered after the Siege of Baler, effectively ending over 300 years of Spanish rule in the country.

American colonial period
In 1901, the Americans incorporated the town into the province of Tayabas. Before the Americans came, Baler was under the district of El Príncipe.

The Comedia de Baler of Aurora mounted its first production in 1927. It was supported by then President Manuel L. Quezon and enjoyed the collaboration of artists Fortunato Esoreña and Alejandro Ferreras and arnis expert Antonino Ramos. Still alive until today, it features a group of colorfully attired performers using authentic weapons, like swords and knives, in their plays.

Japanese occupation
In 1942, the Imperial Japanese Army entered Baler, where they made the Baler Elementary School building as their garrison under the command of a certain Captain Hattori. The general headquarters and camp base of the Philippine Commonwealth Army from 3 January 1942 to 30 June 1946 and the Philippine Constabulary from 28 October 1944 to 30 June 1946 were stationed in Baler. In 1945, Filipino and American troops landed in Baler, including Filipino troops of the 3rd Infantry Division, the 5th Infantry Division, the 51st Infantry Division, and the 52nd Infantry Division of the Philippine Commonwealth Army, the 5th Constabulary Regiment of the Philippine Constabulary, the local recognized guerrilla unit, and the American troops of the 6th Infantry Division of the United States Army. The retreating Japanese troops destroyed the San Luis Obispo de Tolosa Church in Baler.

Post-war period
On 14 June 1951, by virtue of Republic Act No. 648, Baler became the capital town of the sub-province (and later, province) of Aurora.

In 1956, the barrio of Dingalan was converted into a municipal district within Baler and later became a town in its right.

In 1976-7 the helicopter attack and surfing sequences of the film Apocalypse Now were filmed at Baler. The film is credited with having created the Philippine surfing culture and the headland at Baler is known as "Charlie's Point" from a line in the film.

Geography
According to the Philippine Statistics Authority, the municipality has a land area of  constituting  of the  total area of Aurora.

Barangays
Baler is politically subdivided into 13 barangays.

Climate

Demographics

People with connections to the town are referred to as Balerenos. Prior to the arrival of Spanish missionaries in Baler in 1609, settlements by Aeta people and Bugkalot in Baler's coast and mountain areas already exists. Tagalogs, some originating from Palanan and Infanta, Quezon, came in to the area to trade by boat. Some Tagalogs settled in Baler and married with the Aeta and Bugkalots.

The Spanish brought in Filipino acolytes from other areas of Luzon from 1609 to 1899. During this period, Baler can only be access by sea though the town saw increase migration from other parts of Luzon such as Laguna, Tayabas, and Bicol from the south. The opening of the Baler-Bongabon Road allowed easier migration of people from Ilocos and Isabela areas from the north. The road also allowed Igorot people and Batangueños to settle in Baler. In 1896, a group of Ilocanos from Aringay, La Union came to settle in San Jose, now located in Maria Aurora. In 1906, another group of Ilocanos arrived from La Union and Pangasinan.

In the 2020 census, Baler had a population of 43,785.

Economy

Government

The current officials of Baler, Aurora (as of 19 May 2019)

Culture
Baler annually observes the Philippine–Spanish Friendship Day which commemorates the end of the Siege of Baler and celebrates the bilateral relations that have developed since then. It is held every 30 June and the rites which was first done in the provincial capital are also observed in other parts of the country, as well as parts of Spain.

Notable personalities
 Manuel L. Quezon, first president of the Commonwealth of the Philippines
 Aurora Quezon, former first lady of the Philippines, wife of President Manuel L. Quezon
 Eunice Pablo Guerrero-Cucueco, the first female governor of Aurora province
 Edgardo Angara, former senate president, former University of the Philippines president and longest-serving senator in the Philippines
 Bella Angara, the first and currently only female majority floor leader of the House of Representatives of the Philippines
 Sonny Angara, incumbent Philippine senator

Gallery

References

External links

[ Philippine Standard Geographic Code]
Aurora, Philippines – Baler

Municipalities of Aurora (province)
Provincial capitals of the Philippines
Surfing locations in the Philippines
Populated places established in 1609